Mesophleps epiochra is a moth of the family Gelechiidae. It is found in Thailand, Papua New Guinea, Australia (Queensland, the Northern Territory, Western Australia), the Solomon Islands, Vanuatu, New Caledonia, Fiji, Western Samoa, Tonga and the Cook Islands.

The wingspan is 8–20 mm. The forewings are ochreous yellow, scattered with ochreous brown scales and white-tipped brown scales (especially in the apical half).

The larvae feed on Cassia occidentalis, Crotalaria striata, Sophora tomentosa and Vigna unguiculata. They live in the dry seed pods.

References

Moths described in 1886
Mesophleps